Dasychela is a genus of biting horseflies of the family Tabanidae.

Species
Chasmia atripes (Schuurmans Stekhoven, 1926)
Chasmia atriventris (Schuurmans Stekhoven, 1926)
Chasmia auribarba (Mackerras, 1964)
Chasmia bifasciata (Meijere, 1913)
Chasmia bozennae (Trojan, 1991)
Chasmia breviuscula (Walker, 1865)
Chasmia brunnea Burger, 1995
Chasmia conradi (Trojan, 1991)
Chasmia fasciata (Oldroyd, 1949)
Chasmia fulgida (Ricardo, 1913)
Chasmia insularis (Mackerras, 1964)
Chasmia leszeki (Trojan, 1991)
Chasmia lineata Mackerras, 1971
Chasmia maculata Burger, 1995
Chasmia neocaledonica Burger, 1995
Chasmia nigrifrons Mackerras, 1971
Chasmia ochrothorax (Schuurmans Stekhoven, 1926)
Chasmia ornata Mackerras, 1971
Chasmia orthellioides Mackerras, 1971
Chasmia parva (Oldroyd, 1949)
Chasmia parvacallosa (Oldroyd, 1949)
Chasmia queenslandensis Daniels, 2011
Chasmia raffreyi (Bigot, 1892)
Chasmia subhastata (Oldroyd, 1949)
Chasmia variegata (Schuurmans Stekhoven, 1926)

References

Tabanidae
Diptera of Asia
Diptera of Australasia
Taxa named by Günther Enderlein
Brachycera genera